Madjid Ben Haddou (born October 30, 1975) is a former Algerian football player who spent the majority of his playing career with OGC Nice.

Ben Haddou spent the 1999–2000 season on loan with Grenoble in the Championnat National, making 18 appearances and scoring 1 goal.

He had a brief unsuccessful trial with Grimsby Town in 2005.

References

External links
 

1975 births
Algerian expatriates in France
Algerian footballers
Expatriate footballers in France
Grenoble Foot 38 players
Ligue 1 players
Ligue 2 players
Living people
OGC Nice players
People from Oran Province
Association football midfielders
21st-century Algerian people